Aloha! Go Bananas is the debut album of the all-girl punk band Spazzys. It was released in 2004.

Track listing

Original edition 
 "Zombie Girl"
 "Surfen Bird"
 "Sunshine Drive"
 "Action City"
 "Hey Hey Baby"
 "Steal a Kiss"
 "Paco Doesn't Love Me"
 "Shake & Twist"
 "My Boyfriend's Back"
 "Cigarettes"
 "You Left My Heart in the Garage"
 "Zatopeks"
 "My Car Doesn't Brake"
 "I Wanna Cut My Hair Like Marky Ramone"

Japanese edition 

 "Zombie Girl"
 "Surfen Bird"
 "Sunshine Drive"
 "Action City"
 "Hey Hey Baby"
 "Steal A Kiss"
 "Paco Doesn't Love Me"
 "Shake & Twist"
 "My Boyfriend's Back"
 "Cigarettes"
 "You Left My Heart In The Garage"
 "Zatopeks"
 "My Car Doesn't Brake"
 "I Wanna Cut My Hair Like Marky Ramone"
 "Zatopeks" (Live)
 "Shake & Twist" (Live)

Charts

References

2004 debut albums
Spazzys albums